The 2nd Pan American Junior Athletics Championships were held in Barquisimeto, Venezuela, on July 30-August 1, 1982.

Participation (unofficial)

Detailed result lists can be found on the "World Junior Athletics History"
website.  An unofficial count yields the number of about 211
athletes from about 12 countries:  Antigua and Barbuda (1), Argentina (8),
Bermuda (1), Brazil (8), Canada (55), Chile (5), Colombia (16), Cuba (16),
Dominican Republic (1), Puerto Rico (6), United States (63), Venezuela (31).

Medal summary
Medal winners are published.
Complete results can be found on the "World Junior Athletics History"
website.

Men

Women

Medal table (unofficial)

References

External links
World Junior Athletics History

Pan American U20 Athletics Championships
1982 in Venezuelan sport
Pan American U20 Championships
International athletics competitions hosted by Venezuela
Ath
1982 in youth sport